Boccaccini is an Italian surname. Notable people with the surname include:

Aldo R. Boccaccini (born 1962), nuclear engineer and material scientist
Matteo Boccaccini (born 1993), Italian footballer

Italian-language surnames